Isaac Whorton (born March 29, 1980) is an American politician who served as a Republican in the Alabama House of Representatives from the 38th district from 2014 to 2018.

Electoral history

References

1980 births
Living people
Republican Party members of the Alabama House of Representatives